Jordi Martins Almeida (born 3 September 1993), known simply as Jordi, is a Brazilian footballer who plays as a goalkeeper for Novorizontino.

Club career
Born in Volta Redonda, Rio de Janeiro, Jordi joined Vasco da Gama's youth setup in 2009, after starting out at Volta Redonda. On 10 September 2013, he signed a professional contract until 2016.

Jordi was promoted to the main squad in 2014, and acted mainly as a backup to new signing Martín Silva. He made his professional debut on 9 September, starting in a 2–0 home win against Luverdense for the Série B championship.

In his Série A debut on 3 June 2015, Jordi was sent off with only 29 minutes; his team would eventually finish with a 0–3 home defeat to Ponte Preta.

Honours
Vasco
 Campeonato Carioca: 2015, 2016
 Taça Guanabara: 2019

References

External links
 

1993 births
Living people
Brazilian footballers
People from Volta Redonda
Association football goalkeepers
CR Vasco da Gama players
Tractor S.C. players
Centro Sportivo Alagoano players
F.C. Paços de Ferreira players
Grêmio Novorizontino players
Campeonato Brasileiro Série A players
Campeonato Brasileiro Série B players
Persian Gulf Pro League players
Primeira Liga players
Brazilian expatriate footballers
Expatriate footballers in Iran
Expatriate footballers in Portugal
Brazilian expatriate sportspeople in Iran
Sportspeople from Rio de Janeiro (state)